The New Adventures of Heidi is a 1978 American made-for-television musical comedy-drama film updating the Heidi character to the present time and shifting the action from Switzerland to New York City. The film was released theatrically in Spain and Australia. Charles B. Fitzsimons had the idea to turn the film into a musical with comedy writer Buz Kohan writing ten songs for the film, sung by the stars Katy Kurtzman, Burl Ives, John Gavin and Marlyn Mason who played Heidi on stage in 1954 at the Player's Ring Theatre in Hollywood.

Plot
When Heidi's grandfather finds he is losing his sight he does not wish to tell Heidi, but he makes her live with her relatives, Cousins Tobias and Martha to attend school in a large city.  There Heidi meets the troubled Elizabeth Wyler who is fascinated by Heidi and her rural life.  Through his secretary Mady, Heidi joins Elizabeth and her busy widowed father Dan Wyler for a Christmas in New York City.

Cast
Katy Kurtzman as Heidi
Burl Ives as Grandfather
John Gavin as Dan Wyler
Marlyn Mason as Mady
Sherrie Wills as Elizabeth Wyler
Sean Marshall as Peter
Alex Henteloff as Chef Andre
Charles Aidman as The Hermit
Walter Brooke as Cousin Tobias
Amzie Strickland as Cousin Martha
Molly Dodd	as Mother Gertrude
Adrienne Marden as Sister Agnes
Arlen Stuart as Telephone Operator
Barry Cahill as Hotel Manager Krebbs
Bartlett Robinson as Oscar the Butler

Production
With the low budget of the television film precluding having the film shot in Switzerland or New York City, the crew shot Swiss sequences in Snowmass, Colorado with imitation red poppies and the Westin Bonaventure Hotel in Los Angeles, California with imitation snow.

Novelization
A paperback novelization of the film was written by John Pearson and published by Dell Publishing in December 1978 as a promotional tie-in.

See also 
 List of Christmas films

Notes

External links

The New Adventures of Heidi at Internet Archive

1978 television films
1978 films
1970s Christmas films
1970s musical comedy-drama films
American musical comedy-drama films
Christmas television films
NBC network original films
Heidi films
Films set in New York City
Films set in Switzerland
Films shot in Colorado
Films shot in Los Angeles
American Christmas films
Films directed by Ralph Senensky
1970s American films